The 2012 FC Indiana season, is the club's eighth year of existence and first year as a member of the WPSL Elite League

Match results

Key

Note: Results are given with FC Indiana's score listed first.

Preseason

WPSL EL

Club

Roster

Management and staff 
Front Office
Coaching Staff

Standings

See also 
 2012 WPSL Elite League season
 2012 in American soccer
 FC Indiana

References 

Indiana
FC Indiana
Women's football club seasons
Soccer in Indiana